This is a record of South Africa's results at the FIFA World Cup. The FIFA World Cup, sometimes called the Football World Cup, usually referred to simply as the World Cup, is an international association football competition contested by the men's national teams of the members of Fédération Internationale de Football Association (FIFA), the sport's global governing body. The championship has been awarded every four years since the first tournament in 1930, except in 1942 and 1946, due to World War II.

The tournament consists of two parts, the qualification phase, and the final phase (officially called the World Cup Finals). The qualification phase, which currently take place over the three years preceding the Finals, is used to determine which teams qualify for the Finals. The current format of the Finals involves 32 teams competing for the title, at venues within the host nation (or nations) over a period of about a month. The World Cup Finals is the most widely viewed sporting event in the world, with an estimated 715.1 million people watching the 2006 tournament final.

South Africa have appeared in the FIFA World Cup on three occasions in 1998, 2002, and 2010.

Although South Africa has made three appearances in the World Cup, they have not made it past the first round. The team's first attempt to qualify was for the 1994 FIFA World Cup. The team finished second in their group, behind Nigeria, who went on to play at the World Cup. Their first appearance was in France 1998, six years after they had been readmitted to the global football family. Despite a 3–0 drubbing to France in their opening game, they went on to draw against Denmark and Saudi Arabia, the team finished third and thus exited the tournament. Korea/Japan 2002 was expected to be an opportunity for Bafana Bafana to step up to the next level but they were eliminated at the group stage despite drawing to Paraguay and beating Slovenia 1–0 for their first-ever World Cup win. The team finished third in their group, losing out to Paraguay on goals scored. The team failed to qualify for the 2006 FIFA World Cup after finishing third in their qualifying group. Ghana won the group and progressed to the tournament, while Congo DR finished ahead of South Africa on head-to-head results. During the 2010 World Cup on their home soil, they beat France 2–1 and drew 1–1 to Mexico, but lost 0–3 to Uruguay. They lost out on progression to the round of 16, on goal difference, becoming the first World Cup host nation to fail to advance past the group stage.

FIFA World Cup record

*Denotes draws including knockout matches decided on penalty kicks.
**Red border color indicates tournament was held on home soil.

France 1998

Head coach:  Philippe Troussier

Andre Arendse (#22) was injured before the start of the tournament. His replacement, Paul Evans, was also injured shortly after arriving as a replacement. Simon Gopane was then called up, and sat on the bench for the last two matches.

France vs South Africa

South Africa vs Denmark
Benni McCarthy scored South Africa's first ever goal in the World Cup when he received the ball on the edge of the penalty box before shooting low left footed through the legs of Peter Schmeichel to level the match.

South Africa vs Saudi Arabia

Korea/Japan 2002

Head coach: Jomo Sono

Paraguay vs South Africa

South Africa vs Slovenia
Siyabonga Nomvethe scored the only goal of the game, in the fourth minute. A free kick from Quinton Fortune on the left came to Nomvethe and although he mistimed his header, the ball cannoned into the net off his thigh.

South Africa vs Spain

South Africa 2010

Coach:  Carlos Alberto Parreira

South Africa vs Mexico
South Africa vs Mexico was the opening match of the World Cup, held on 11 June 2010. It was described as an "enthralling" and "pulsating" match. South Africa opened the scoring in the 55th minute after Siphiwe Tshabalala scored off a pass through Mexico's defence by Teko Modise. Mexico's captain Rafael Márquez equalised following a corner kick in the 79th minute. In the final minutes of the match, Katlego Mphela almost scored a winning goal for South Africa, but his shot bounced off the post.

Tshabalala was named as the man of the match. South Africa's coach, Carlos Alberto Parreira called the result "fair", while Mexico's coach Javier Aguirre stated "we could have won, we could have lost".

South Africa vs Uruguay

France vs South Africa
Two teams have met three times but recently in the 1998 FIFA World Cup won by France 30.

Bongani Khumalo scored the first goal to make it 10 in 25th minute Yoann Gourcuff was shown a red card after a serious foul, Katlego Mphela made it 20 in half-time, South Africa made several chances in second half, Hugo Lloris saved Katlego Mphela's shot to make a third goal, Bacary Sagna made a back pass to the French player Florent Malouda scored a goal to make it 21 from an assist by Franck Ribéry, South Africa made even more chances in second half, 2-1 was the final score of the match. France were eliminated from the World Cup with a single point in the Group stage.

Although South Africa became the first host nation to exit the World Cup group stage in history.

Record players

Top goalscorers

References

External links
South Africa at FIFA

 
Countries at the FIFA World Cup
Fifa World Cup